The Turkic languages are a language family of over 35 documented languages, spoken by the Turkic peoples of Eurasia from Eastern Europe and Southern Europe to Central Asia, East Asia, North Asia (Siberia), and Western Asia. The Turkic languages originated in a region of East Asia spanning from Mongolia to Northwest China, where Proto-Turkic is thought to have been spoken, from where they expanded to Central Asia and farther west during the first millennium. They are characterized as a dialect continuum.

Turkic languages are spoken by some 200 million people. The Turkic language with the greatest number of speakers is Turkish, spoken mainly in Anatolia and the Balkans; its native speakers account for about 38% of all Turkic speakers.

Characteristic features such as vowel harmony, agglutination, subject-object-verb order, and lack of grammatical gender, are almost universal within the Turkic family. 
There is a high degree of mutual intelligibility, upon moderate exposure, among the various Oghuz languages, which include Turkish, Azerbaijani, Turkmen, Qashqai, Chaharmahali Turkic, Gagauz, and Balkan Gagauz Turkish, as well as Oghuz-influenced Crimean Tatar. Other Turkic languages demonstrate varying amounts of mutual intelligibility within their subgroups as well. Although methods of classification vary, the Turkic languages are usually considered to be divided into two branches: Oghur, the only surviving member of which is Chuvash, and Common Turkic, which includes all other Turkic languages.

Turkic languages show many similarities with the Mongolic, Tungusic, Koreanic, and Japonic languages. These similarities have led some linguists to propose an Altaic language family, though this proposal is widely rejected by Western historical linguists. Similarities with the Uralic languages even caused these families to be regarded as one for a long time under the Ural-Altaic hypothesis. However, there has not been sufficient evidence to conclude the existence of either of these macrofamilies, the shared characteristics between the languages being attributed presently to extensive prehistoric language contact.

Characteristics

Turkic languages are null-subject languages, have vowel harmony (with the notable exception of Uzbek), extensive agglutination by means of suffixes and postpositions, and lack of grammatical articles, noun classes, and grammatical gender. Subject–object–verb word order is universal within the family.

History

Pre-history
The homeland of the Turkic peoples and their language is suggested to be somewhere between the Transcaspian steppe and Northeastern Asia (Manchuria), with genetic evidence pointing to the region near South Siberia and Mongolia as the "Inner Asian Homeland" of the Turkic ethnicity. Similarly several linguists, including Juha Janhunen, Roger Blench and Matthew Spriggs, suggest that modern-day Mongolia is the homeland of the early Turkic language. Relying on Proto-Turkic lexical items about the climate, topography, flora, fauna, people's modes of subsistence, Turkologist Peter Benjamin Golden locates the Proto-Turkic Urheimat in the southern, taiga-steppe zone of the Sayan-Altay region.

Extensive contact took place between Proto-Turks and Proto-Mongols approximately during the first millennium BC; the shared cultural tradition between the two Eurasian nomadic groups is called the "Turco-Mongol" tradition. The two groups shared a similar religion system, Tengrism, and there exists a multitude of evident loanwords between Turkic languages and Mongolic languages. Although the loans were bidirectional, today Turkic loanwords constitute the largest foreign component in Mongolian vocabulary.

Some lexical and extensive typological similarities between Turkic and the nearby Tungusic and Mongolic families, as well as the Korean and Japonic families has in more recent years been instead attributed to prehistoric contact amongst the group, sometimes referred to as the Northeast Asian sprachbund. A more recent (circa first millennium BC) contact between "core Altaic" (Turkic, Mongolic, and Tungusic) is distinguished from this, due to the existence of definitive common words that appear to have been mostly borrowed from Turkic into Mongolic, and later from Mongolic into Tungusic, as Turkic borrowings into Mongolic significantly outnumber Mongolic borrowings into Turkic, and Turkic and Tungusic do not share any words that do not also exist in Mongolic.

Turkic languages also show some Chinese loanwords that point to early contact during the time of Proto-Turkic.

Robbeets (et al. 2015 and et al. 2017) suggest that the homeland of the Turkic languages was somewhere in Manchuria, close to the Mongolic, Tungusic and Koreanic homeland (including the ancestor of Japonic), and that these languages share a common "Transeurasian" origin. More evidence for the proposed ancestral "Transeurasian" origin was presented by Nelson et al. 2020 and Li et al. 2020.

Early written records

The first established records of the Turkic languages are the eighth century AD Orkhon inscriptions by the Göktürks, recording the Old Turkic language, which were discovered in 1889 in the Orkhon Valley in Mongolia. The Compendium of the Turkic Dialects (Divânü Lügati't-Türk), written during the 11th century AD by Kaşgarlı Mahmud of the Kara-Khanid Khanate, constitutes an early linguistic treatment of the family. The Compendium is the first comprehensive dictionary of the Turkic languages and also includes the first known map of the Turkic speakers' geographical distribution. It mainly pertains to the Southwestern branch of the family.

The Codex Cumanicus (12th–13th centuries AD) concerning the Northwestern branch is another early linguistic manual, between the Kipchak language and Latin, used by the Catholic missionaries sent to the Western Cumans inhabiting a region corresponding to present-day Hungary and Romania. The earliest records of the language spoken by Volga Bulgars, the parent to today's Chuvash language, are dated to the 13th–14th centuries AD.

Geographical expansion and development

With the Turkic expansion during the Early Middle Ages (c. 6th–11th centuries AD), Turkic languages, in the course of just a few centuries, spread across Central Asia, from Siberia to the Mediterranean. Various terminologies from the Turkic languages have passed into Persian, Urdu, Ukrainian, Russian, Chinese, Mongolian, Hungarian and to a lesser extent, Arabic.

The geographical distribution of Turkic-speaking peoples across Eurasia since the Ottoman era ranges from the North-East of Siberia to Turkey in the West. (See picture in the box on the right above.)

For centuries, the Turkic-speaking peoples have migrated extensively and intermingled continuously, and their languages have been influenced mutually and through contact with the surrounding languages, especially the Iranian, Slavic, and Mongolic languages.

This has obscured the historical developments within each language and/or language group, and as a result, there exist several systems to classify the Turkic languages. The modern genetic classification schemes for Turkic are still largely indebted to Samoilovich (1922).

The Turkic languages may be divided into six branches:
 Common Turkic
 Southwestern (Oghuz Turkic)
 Southeastern (Karluk Turkic)
 Northwestern (Kipchak Turkic)
 Northeastern (Siberian Turkic)
 Arghu Turkic
 Oghur Turkic

In this classification, Oghur Turkic is also referred to as Lir-Turkic, and the other branches are subsumed under the title of Shaz-Turkic or Common Turkic. It is not clear when these two major types of Turkic can be assumed to have diverged.

With less certainty, the Southwestern, Northwestern, Southeastern and Oghur groups may further be summarized as West Turkic, the Northeastern, Kyrgyz-Kipchak, and Arghu (Khalaj) groups as East Turkic.

Geographically and linguistically, the languages of the Northwestern and Southeastern subgroups belong to the central Turkic languages, while the Northeastern and Khalaj languages are the so-called peripheral languages.

Hruschka, et al. (2014) use computational phylogenetic methods to calculate a tree of Turkic based on phonological sound changes.

Schema
The following isoglosses are traditionally used in the classification of the Turkic languages:
 Rhotacism (or in some views, zetacism), e.g. in the last consonant of the word for "nine" *tokkuz. This separates the Oghur branch, which exhibits /r/, from the rest of Turkic, which exhibits /z/. In this case, rhotacism refers to the development of *-/r/, *-/z/, and *-/d/ to /r/,*-/k/,*-/kh/ in this branch. See Antonov and Jacques (2012) on the debate concerning rhotacism and lambdacism in Turkic.
 Intervocalic *d, e.g. the second consonant in the word for "foot" *hadaq
 Suffix-final -G, e.g. in the suffix *lIG, in e.g. *tāglïg
Additional isoglosses include:
 Preservation of word initial *h, e.g. in the word for "foot" *hadaq. This separates Khalaj as a peripheral language.
 Denasalisation of palatal *ń, e.g. in the word for "moon", *āń

*In the standard Istanbul dialect of Turkish, the ğ in dağ and dağlı is not realized as a consonant, but as a slight lengthening of the preceding vowel.

Members 
The following table is based mainly upon the classification scheme presented by Lars Johanson

Vocabulary comparison
The following is a brief comparison of cognates among the basic vocabulary across the Turkic language family (about 60 words).

Empty cells do not necessarily imply that a particular language is lacking a word to describe the concept, but rather that the word for the concept in that language may be formed from another stem and is not cognate with the other words in the row or that a loanword is used in its place.

Also, there may be shifts in the meaning from one language to another, and so the "Common meaning" given is only approximate. In some cases, the form given is found only in some dialects of the language, or a loanword is much more common (e.g. in Turkish, the preferred word for "fire" is the Persian-derived ateş, whereas the native od is dead). Forms are given in native Latin orthographies unless otherwise noted.

Azerbaijani "ǝ" and "ä": IPA /æ/

Turkish and Azerbaijani "ı", Karakhanid "ɨ", Turkmen "y", and Sakha "ï": IPA /ɯ/

Turkmen "ň", Karakhanid "ŋ": IPA /ŋ/

Turkish and Azerbaijani "y",Turkmen "ý" and "j" in other languages: IPA /j/

All "ş" and "š" letters: IPA /ʃ/

All "ç" and "č" letters: IPA /t͡ʃ/

Kyrgyz and Kazakh "j": IPA /d͡ʒ/

Other possible relations 
The Turkic language family is currently regarded as one of the world's primary language families. Turkic is one of the main members of the controversial Altaic language family. There are some other theories about an external relationship but none of them are generally accepted.

Korean 
The possibility of a genetic relation between Turkic and Korean, independently from Altaic, is suggested by some linguists. The linguist Kabak (2004) of the University of Würzburg states that Turkic and Korean share similar phonology as well as morphology. Li Yong-Sŏng (2014) suggest that there are several cognates between Turkic and Old Korean. He states that these supposed cognates can be useful to reconstruct the early Turkic language. According to him, words related to nature, earth and ruling but especially to the sky and stars seem to be cognates.

The linguist Choi suggested already in 1996 a close relationship between Turkic and Korean regardless of any Altaic connections:

Many historians also point out a close non-linguistic relationship between Turkic peoples and Koreans. Especially close were the relations between the Göktürks and Goguryeo.

Rejected or controversial theories

Uralic 
Some linguists suggested a relation to Uralic languages, especially to the Ugric languages. This view is rejected and seen as obsolete by mainstream linguists. Similarities are because of language contact and borrowings mostly from Turkic into Ugric languages. Stachowski (2015) states that any relation between Turkic and Uralic must be a contact one.

See also
 Altaic languages
 List of Turkic languages
 List of Turkic-languages poets
 List of Ukrainian words of Turkic origin
 Middle Turkic languages
 Old Turkic
 Old Turkic script
 Proto-Turkic language

Notes

References

Further reading

 Akhatov G. Kh. 1960. "About the stress in the language of the Siberian Tatars in connection with the stress of modern Tatar literary language" .- Sat *"Problems of Turkic and the history of Russian Oriental Studies." Kazan. 
 Akhatov G.Kh. 1963. "Dialect West Siberian Tatars" (monograph). Ufa. 
 Baskakov, N. A. (1962, 1969). Introduction to the study of the Turkic languages. Moscow. 
 Boeschoten, Hendrik & Lars Johanson. 2006. Turkic languages in contact. Turcologica, Bd. 61. Wiesbaden: Harrassowitz. 
 Clausen, Gerard. 1972. An etymological dictionary of pre-thirteenth-century Turkish. Oxford: Oxford University Press.
 Deny, Jean et al. 1959–1964. Philologiae Turcicae Fundamenta. Wiesbaden: Harrassowitz.
 Dolatkhah, Sohrab. 2016. Parlons qashqay. In: collection "parlons". Paris: L'Harmattan.
 Dolatkhah, Sohrab. 2016. Le qashqay: langue turcique d'Iran. CreateSpace Independent Publishing Platform (online).
 Dolatkhah, Sohrab. 2015. Qashqay Folktales. CreateSpace Independent Publishing Platform (online).
 Johanson, Lars & Éva Agnes Csató (ed.). 1998. The Turkic languages. London: Routledge. .
 Johanson, Lars. 1998. "The history of Turkic." In: Johanson & Csató, pp. 81–125. 
 Johanson, Lars. 1998. "Turkic languages." In: Encyclopædia Britannica. CD 98. Encyclopædia Britannica Online, 5 sept. 2007. 
 Menges, K. H. 1968. The Turkic languages and peoples: An introduction to Turkic studies. Wiesbaden: Harrassowitz.
 Öztopçu, Kurtuluş. 1996. Dictionary of the Turkic languages: English, Azerbaijani, Kazakh, Kyrgyz, Tatar, Turkish, Turkmen, Uighur, Uzbek. London: Routledge. 
 Samoilovich, A. N. 1922. Some additions to the classification of the Turkish languages. Petrograd.
 Savelyev, Alexander and Martine Robbeets. (2019). lexibank/savelyevturkic: Turkic Basic Vocabulary Database (Version v1.0) [Data set]. Zenodo. 
 Schönig, Claus. 1997–1998. "A new attempt to classify the Turkic languages I-III." Turkic Languages 1:1.117–133, 1:2.262–277, 2:1.130–151.
 Schönig, Claus. “THE INTERNAL DIVISION OF MODERN TURKIC AND ITS HISTORICAL IMPLICATIONS”. In: Acta Orientalia Academiae Scientiarum Hungaricae, vol. 52, no. 1, 1999, pp. 63–95. JSTOR, http://www.jstor.org/stable/43391369 . Accessed 3 Jan. 2023.
 Starostin, Sergei A., Anna V. Dybo, and Oleg A. Mudrak. 2003. Etymological Dictionary of the Altaic Languages. Leiden: Brill. 
 Voegelin, C.F. & F.M. Voegelin. 1977. Classification and index of the World's languages. New York: Elsevier.

External links 

 Interactive map of Turkic languages
 Turkic Languages Verb Comparison
 Turkic Language Portal (English)
 Turkic Inscriptions of Orkhon Valley, Mongolia 
 Turkic Languages: Resources – University of Michigan
 Map of Turkic languages by Goethe University Frankfurt
 Classification of Turkic Languages by Lars Johanson
 Groupping chart of Turkic Languages
 Online Uyghur–English Dictionary
 
 Turkic language vocabulary comparison tool / dictionary
 A Comparative Dictionary of Turkic Languages Open Project
 The Turkic Languages in a Nutshell  with illustrations.
 Turkic basic vocabularies at Zenodo
 Monumenta Altaica (Grammar and other sources by Russian Academy of Sciences)
 Turkic Interlingua (NLP project for Turkic languages)
 Turkic Database at Elegant Lexicon (Comprehensive lexical database for Turkic languages)
 TurkLang Conference: Astana, Kazakhstan, 2013, Istanbul, Turkey, 2014 , Kazan, Tatarstan, 2015

 
Agglutinative languages
Language families
History of Ural